Lu Yang (born 1979) is a Chinese film director and screenwriter best known for his works My Spectacular Theatre, Brotherhood of Blades and Brotherhood of Blades II: The Infernal Battlefield.

Early life and education
A native of Beijing, Lu Yang graduated from the Beijing Film Academy, where he majored in directing at the Director Department. He once worked in Phoenix Television.

Career
He made his directorial debut Suzhou Bridge in 2005. That same year, he also directed Happy Life.

In 2010, he wrote and directed My Spectacular Theatre, which earned his Best Director of the Debut Award at the 28th Golden Rooster Awards and won the Audience Award at the 15th Busan International Film Festival.

In 2014, he wrote and directed the historical action movie Brotherhood of Blades, for which he received Young Director of the Year Award at the China Film Director Association and Best Director of the Debut Award at the 16th Huading Awards, and was nominated for Best Director of the Debut, Best Director, and Best Film Awards at the 15th Chinese Film Media Awards. It starred Chang Chen, Liu Shishi, Wang Qianyuan. It was also produced by Terence Chang, Wang Donghui and Ling Hong. At the same year, he also directed Ex Fighting, starring Lian Kai, Xiong Naijin, Zhu Dan and Ma Yuan. The film was released on October 14, 2014.

In 2017, he wrote and directed Brotherhood of Blades II: The Infernal Battlefield, a sequel to Brotherhood of Blades. It starred Chang Chen, Yang Mi and Zhang Yi, and it was produced by Ning Hao and Wang Yibing. The film was released in China on July 19, 2017, and has grossed  in China.

Filmography

Film

TV series

Film and TV Awards

References

External links
 
 Lu Yang Douban 

1979 births
Screenwriters from Beijing
Living people
Beijing Film Academy alumni
Film directors from Beijing